Haploceras  is a genus of late Upper Jurassic (Kimmeridgian and Tithonian) ammonoid cephalopods and the type for the Haploceratidae, similar to Lissoceras but with a broader whorl section and small blunt lappets and a blunt rostrum; some species with feeble ventral  folds on body chamber.

Distribution 
Jurassic deposites in North America, Africa, Europe and the mid east.

References 

 Arkell et al., 1957  Mesozoic Ammonoidea, Treatise on Invertebrate Paleontology Part L. Geol Society of America and Univ Kansas Press R.C Moore (ed)

Ammonitida genera
Haploceratoidea
Jurassic ammonites
Ammonites of Europe
Kimmeridgian life
Tithonian life